is a railway station on the Senseki Line in the city of  Shiogama, Miyagi Prefecture, Japan, operated by East Japan Railway Company (JR East).

Lines
Higashi-Shiogama Station is served by the Senseki Line, and is located 17.2 kilometers from the terminus of the Senseki Line at Aoba-dōri Station.

Station layout
Higashi-Shiogama Station has one elevated side platform and one elevated island platform with the station building underneath.

Platforms

History
Higashi-Shiogama Station opened on April 18, 1927 as a station on the Miyagi Electric Railway. The line was nationalized on May 1, 1944. On November 1, 1981 the station was relocated to its present location. The station was absorbed into the JR East network upon the privatization of Japanese National Railways (JNR) on April 1, 1987.

Passenger statistics
In fiscal 2016, the station was used by an average of 2,458 passengers daily (boarding passengers only).

Surrounding area
Shiogama Port
National Route 45
Uminomachi Fine Arts Museum

See also
 List of railway stations in Japan

References

External links

  

Railway stations in Miyagi Prefecture
Senseki Line
Railway stations in Japan opened in 1927
Stations of East Japan Railway Company
Shiogama, Miyagi